Rhinocypha is a genus of damselflies in the family Chlorocyphidae.

Genera 
The genus contains the following species:

References

Chlorocyphidae
Taxa named by Jules Pierre Rambur
Zygoptera genera
Damselflies
Taxonomy articles created by Polbot